Comitas spencerensis is an extinct species of sea snail, a marine gastropod mollusk in the family Pseudomelatomidae, the turrids and allies.

This species was tentatively placed by the author in Comitas, although future studies may prove the need for a new generic name.

Description
The length of the incomplete shell attains 24 mm, its diameter 10 mm.

Distribution
Fossils of this extinct species were found in Miocene strata near Spencer Creek, Astoria formation, Oregon, USA.

References

External linkls
 Worldwide Mollusc Species Data Base: Comitas spencerensis

spencerensis
Gastropods described in 1962